{{Taxobox
| name = Litiopa melanostoma
| image = Litiopa melanostoma 01.jpg
| image_caption = Litiopa melanostoma sea snail (Rang, 1829), juvenile shell, originally from Puerto Rico 
| regnum = Animalia
| phylum = Mollusca
| classis = Gastropoda
| unranked_superfamilia = clade Caenogastropodaclade Sorbeoconcha
| superfamilia = Cerithioidea
| familia = Litiopidae
| subfamilia =
| genus = Litiopa| subgenus =
| species = L. melanostoma| binomial = Litiopa melanostoma| binomial_authority = (Rang, 1829)
| synonyms_ref =
| synonyms =
 Abaconia naufraga (Clench, 1938)
 Bombyxinus uva Bélanger in Lesson, 1831 
 Buccinum litiopa Quoy & Gaimard, 1833 
 Litiopa bombix Kiener, 1833 
 Litiopa decussata Gould, 1852 
 Litiopa divisa Carpenter, 1855 
 Litiopa grateloupeana Drouet, 1858 
 Litiopa maculata Rang, 1829 
 Litiopa nitidula Pfeiffer, 1840 
 Litiopa striata Pfeiffer, 1840 
}}Litiopa melanostoma, common name the brown Sargassum shell, is a species of very small sea snail, a marine gastropod mollusk or micromollusk in the family Litiopidae.

Distribution
This species occurs in the Gulf of Mexico, the Caribbean Sea, the Lesser Antilles, Puerto Rico and off the Azores; in the North Atlantic Ocean, off Newfoundland.

 Description Litiopa melanostoma (Sargassum Snail) has been found to have a maximum recorded shell length of 6 mm.

 Habitat 
The minimum recorded depth for this species is 0 m; the maximum recorded depth is 805 m. The snail is known to live on floating beds of Sargassum.

References

 Rang S. (1829). Notice sur le Litiope, Litiopa, genre nouveau de Mollusque astéropode''. Annales des Sciences Naturelles 16: 303–307 page(s): 307

External links
 

Litiopidae
Gastropods described in 1829